Alofitai, often simply named Alofi, is a village in Wallis and Futuna. It is located on the northwestern coast of Alofi Island. It belongs to the chiefdom of Alo.

Overview
In 2003, a total of two people were recorded as permanent residents of the village of Alofitai; as of the 2008 census, only one person was listed as a permanent resident. Although Alofi Island is virtually uninhabited, the village is a base for tobacco production, and has a small chapel that is used by the Futunans who visit the island on Sundays.

References

Populated places in Wallis and Futuna